The Colorado River is one of the principal rivers (along with the Rio Grande) in the Southwestern United States and in northern Mexico. The  river drains an expansive, arid watershed that encompasses parts of seven U.S. states and two Mexican states. The name Colorado derives from the Spanish language for "colored reddish" due to its heavy silt load. Starting in the central Rocky Mountains of Colorado, it flows generally southwest across the Colorado Plateau and through the Grand Canyon before reaching Lake Mead on the Arizona–Nevada border, where it turns south toward the international border. After entering Mexico, the Colorado approaches the mostly dry Colorado River Delta at the tip of the Gulf of California between Baja California and Sonora.

Known for its dramatic canyons, whitewater rapids, and eleven U.S. National Parks, the Colorado River and its tributaries are a vital source of water for 40 million people. An extensive system of dams, reservoirs, and aqueducts divert almost its entire flow for agricultural irrigation and urban water supply. Its large flow and steep gradient are used to generate hydroelectricity, meeting peaking power demands in much of the Intermountain West. Intensive water consumption has dried up the lower  of the river, which has rarely reached the sea since the 1960s.

Native Americans have inhabited the Colorado River basin for at least 8,000 years. Starting around 1 AD, large agriculture-based societies were established, but a combination of drought and poor land use practices led to their collapse in the 1300s. Their descendants include tribes such as the Puebloans, while others including the Navajo settled in the Colorado Basin after the 1000s. In the 1500s, Spanish explorers began mapping and claiming the watershed, which became part of Mexico upon its independence in 1821. Even after most of the watershed became US territory in 1846, much of the river's course remained unknown. Several expeditions charted the Colorado in the mid-19th century—one of which, led by John Wesley Powell, was the first to run the rapids of the Grand Canyon. Large-scale settlement of the lower basin began in the mid- to late-1800s, with steamboats sailing from the Gulf of California to landings along the river that linked to wagon roads to the interior. Starting in the 1860s, gold and silver strikes drew prospectors to the upper Colorado River basin.

Large-scale river management began in the early 1900s, with major guidelines established in a series of international and US interstate treaties known as the "Law of the River". The US federal government constructed most of the major dams and aqueducts between 1910 and 1970; the largest, Hoover Dam, was completed in 1935. Numerous water projects have also involved state and local governments. With all of their waters fully allocated, both the Colorado and neighboring the Rio Grande are now considered among the most controlled and litigated river systems in the world.

The environmental movement in the American Southwest has opposed the damming and diversion of the Colorado River system due to negative effects on the ecology and natural beauty of the river and its tributaries. During the construction of Glen Canyon Dam (1956–66), environmental organizations vowed to block any further development of the river, and a number of later dam and aqueduct proposals were defeated by citizen opposition. Since 2000, extended drought has conflicted with increasing demands for Colorado River water, and the level of human development and control of the river continues to generate controversy.

Course

After a short run south, the river turns west below Grand Lake, the largest natural lake in the state. For the first  of its course, the Colorado carves its way through the mountainous Western Slope, a sparsely populated region defined by the portion of the state west of the Continental Divide. As it flows southwest, it gains strength from many small tributaries, as well as larger ones including the Blue, Eagle and Roaring Fork rivers. After passing through De Beque Canyon, the Colorado emerges from the Rockies into the Grand Valley, a major farming and ranching region where it meets one of its largest tributaries, the Gunnison River, at Grand Junction. In a few areas, such as the marshy Kawuneeche Valley near the headwaters and the Grand Valley, it exhibits braided characteristics.

From Grand Junction, the Colorado turns northwest before cutting southwest across the eponymous Colorado Plateau, a vast area of high desert centered at the Four Corners of the southwestern United States. Here, the climate becomes significantly drier than that in the Rocky Mountains, and the river becomes entrenched in progressively deeper gorges of bare rock, beginning with Ruby Canyon and then Westwater Canyon as it enters Utah, now once again heading southwest. Farther downstream it receives the Dolores River and defines the southern border of Arches National Park, before passing Moab and flowing through "The Portal", where it exits the Moab Valley between a pair of  sandstone cliffs.

In Utah, the Colorado flows primarily through the "slickrock" country, which is characterized by its narrow canyons and unique "folds" created by the tilting of sedimentary rock layers along faults. This is one of the most inaccessible regions of the continental United States. Below the confluence with the Green River, its largest tributary, in Canyonlands National Park, the Colorado enters Cataract Canyon, named for its dangerous rapids, and then Glen Canyon, known for its arches and erosion-sculpted Navajo sandstone formations. Here, the San Juan River, carrying runoff from the southern slope of Colorado's San Juan Mountains, joins the Colorado from the east. The Colorado then enters northern Arizona, where since the 1960s Glen Canyon Dam near Page has flooded the Glen Canyon reach of the river, forming Lake Powell for hydroelectricity generation.

In Arizona, the river passes Lee's Ferry, an important crossing for early explorers and settlers and since the early 20th century the principal point where Colorado River flows are measured for apportionment to the seven U.S. and two Mexican states in the basin. Downstream, the river enters Marble Canyon, the beginning of the Grand Canyon, passing under the Navajo Bridges on a now southward course. Below the confluence with the Little Colorado River, the river swings west into Granite Gorge, the most dramatic portion of the Grand Canyon, where the river cuts up to  into the Colorado Plateau, exposing some of the oldest visible rocks on Earth, dating as long ago as 2 billion years.

At the lower end of Grand Canyon, the Colorado widens into Lake Mead, the largest reservoir in the continental United States, formed by Hoover Dam on the border of Arizona and Nevada. Situated southeast of metropolitan Las Vegas, the dam is an integral component for management of the Colorado River, controlling floods and storing water for farms and cities in the lower Colorado River basin.

After leaving the confines of the Black Canyon, the river emerges from the Colorado Plateau into the Lower Colorado River Valley (LCRV), a desert region dependent on irrigation agriculture and tourism and also home to several major Indian reservations. Before channelization of the Colorado in the 20th century, the lower river was subject to frequent course changes caused by seasonal flow variations. Joseph C. Ives, who surveyed the lower river in 1861, wrote that "the shifting of the channel, the banks, the islands, the bars is so continual and rapid that a detailed description, derived from the experiences of one trip, would be found incorrect, not only during the subsequent year, but perhaps in the course of a week, or even a day."

The LCRV is one of the most densely populated areas along the river, and there are numerous towns including Bullhead City, Arizona, Needles, California, and Lake Havasu City, Arizona. Here, several large diversions draw from the river, providing water for both local uses and distant regions including the Salt River Valley of Arizona and metropolitan Southern California. The last major U.S. diversion is at Imperial Dam, where over 90 percent of the river's flow is moved into the Gila Gravity Canal and Yuma Area Project, and the much bigger All-American Canal to irrigate California's Imperial Valley, the most productive winter agricultural region in the United States.

At Morelos Dam, the entire remaining flow of the Colorado is diverted to irrigate the Mexicali Valley, among Mexico's most fertile agricultural lands. Below San Luis Río Colorado, the Colorado passes entirely into Mexico, defining the Baja California–Sonora border. Since 1960, the stretch of the Colorado between here and the Gulf of California has been dry or a trickle formed by irrigation return flows. Occasionally the International Boundary and Water Commission allows a springtime pulse flow to recharge the delta.

Before 20th-century development dewatered the lower Colorado, a major tidal bore was present in the delta and estuary; the first historical record was made by the Croatian missionary in Spanish service Father Ferdinand Konščak on July 18, 1746. During spring tide conditions, the tidal bore—locally called El Burro—formed in the estuary about Montague Island in Baja California and propagated upstream.

Major tributaries

The Colorado is joined by over 25 significant tributaries, of which the Green River is the largest by both length and discharge. The Green River takes drainage from the Wind River Range of west-central Wyoming, from Utah's Uinta Mountains, and from the Rockies of northwestern Colorado. The Gila River is the second longest and drains a greater area than the Green, but has a significantly lower flow because of a more arid climate and larger diversions for irrigation and cities. Both the Gunnison and San Juan rivers, which derive most of their water from Rocky Mountains snowmelt, contribute more water than the Gila contributed naturally.

Discharge
Its flow regime was not at all steady – indeed, "prior to the construction of federal dams and reservoirs, the Colorado was a river of extremes like no other in the United States." Since the construction of Hoover Dam, the lower Colorado rarely exceeds  or drops below .

About 85–90 percent of the Colorado River's discharge originates in melting snowpack from the Rocky Mountains of Colorado and Wyoming. The remaining 10 to 15 percent comes from a variety of sources, primarily groundwater and summer monsoon storms. Tributaries in the Lower Basin are prone to monsoon–caused flash floods, but these storms do not often contribute significant volumes of runoff. Annual runoff follows snowmelt, which typically begins in April, peaking in May and June before exhausting in July or August.

Due to water diversions, flows at the mouth of the river have steadily declined since the early 1900s. Since 1960, the Colorado has typically dried up before reaching the sea, with the exception of a few wet years. In addition to water consumption, flows have declined due to evaporation from reservoirs and warming temperatures that reduce winter snow accumulation. Several of the Colorado's major tributaries, including the Gila River, also no longer reach the Colorado due to upstream diversions.

Below this location, the remaining flow is diverted to irrigate the Mexicali Valley, leaving a dry riverbed from Morelos Dam to the sea that is supplemented by intermittent flows of irrigation drainage water. There have been exceptions, however, particularly in 1983–1987, when the Colorado once again reached the sea after consecutive seasons of record-breaking snowfall. In 1984,  of excess runoff reached the ocean.

The United States Geological Survey (USGS) operates or has operated 46 stream gauges to measure the discharge of the Colorado River, ranging from the headwaters near Grand Lake to the Mexico–U.S. border. The tables at right list data associated with eight of these gauges. This figure has been heavily affected by upstream diversions and reservoir evaporation, especially after the completion of the Colorado River Storage Project in the 1970s.

Drainage basin

About , or 97 percent of the basin, is in the United States. The basin extends into western Colorado and New Mexico, southwestern Wyoming, eastern and southern Utah, southeastern Nevada and California, and most of Arizona. The areas drained within Baja California and Sonora in Mexico are very small and do not contribute significant runoff. Aside from the Colorado River Delta, the basin extends into Sonora at a few locations further east, including the headwaters of the Santa Cruz River and San Pedro River (both tributaries of the Gila River). For hydrological management purposes, the Colorado River Basin is divided into the Upper Basin (the drainage area above Lees Ferry), and the Lower Basin. The Upper Basin covers only 45 percent of the land area of the Colorado River Basin, but contributes 92 percent of the runoff.

The entire eastern boundary of the Colorado River Basin runs along the North American Continental Divide and is defined largely by the Rocky Mountains and the Rio Grande Basin. The Wind River Range in Wyoming marks the northern extent of the basin, and is separated from the Colorado Rockies by the endorheic Great Divide Basin in southwestern Wyoming. Streams that are nearby the east side of the divide drain into the Mississippi River and Rio Grande, while nearby areas north of the Wind River Range drain into the Columbia River. The western boundary of the Colorado River Basin is formed by various ranges and plateaus that border the Great Basin, including the Uinta Mountains and Wasatch Range. Major Great Basin watersheds bordering the Colorado River Basin are the Great Salt Lake and Sevier Lake watersheds. To the south, the Colorado River Basin borders several watersheds in Mexico draining into the Gulf of California, including the Sonoyta, Concepción, and Yaqui rivers.

About 72 percent of the Colorado River Basin is classified as arid, with the Sonoran and Mojave deserts covering the southern portion and the Colorado Plateau encompassing much of the central portion. The Colorado Plateau is home to most of the major canyon systems formed by the Colorado River and its tributaries, particularly those of the Green and San Juan rivers. About 23 percent of the basin is forest, with the largest area in the Rocky Mountains; other significant forested areas include the Kaibab, Aquarius, and Markagunt plateaus in southern Utah and northern Arizona, and the Mogollon Rim in central Arizona. These high plateaus and escarpments, often exceeding  in elevation, form the northern and southern edges of the Colorado Plateau geological province. Developed land use in the basin is mostly irrigated agriculture, chiefly in the Grand Valley, the Lower Colorado River Valley, and the Salt River Valley, but the total area of crop and pasture land is only 2–3 percent of the entire basin. Urban areas cover less than 1 percent.

Climate in the Colorado River Basin ranges from subtropical hot desert at southern, lower elevations to alpine in the Rocky Mountains. The Upper Basin generally receives snow and rain during the winter and early spring, while precipitation in the Lower Basin falls mainly during intense but infrequent summer thunderstorms brought on by the North American Monsoon. Precipitation is influenced by the El Niño-Southern Oscillation (ENSO) with El Niño being associated with wetter conditions and La Niña with drier conditions. The effect of ENSO is significantly more pronounced in the Lower Basin, where it has a strong impact on monsoonal rainfall. Runoff patterns across the Colorado River Basin reflect this; most of the perennial tributaries originate in the Upper Basin, while tributaries in the Lower Basin are either ephemeral (such as the Little Colorado River) or highly seasonal (such as the Gila and Salt rivers).

As of 2010, approximately 13 million people lived within the Colorado River basin, while about 40 million people live in areas supplied by Colorado River water. Colorado River basin states are among the fastest-growing in the US; the population of Nevada alone increased by about 66 percent between 1990 and 2000 as Arizona grew by some 40 percent. Phoenix, Arizona, Las Vegas, Nevada and Mexicali, Baja California are the largest cities by population within the Colorado River Basin. Other significant cities include Tucson, Arizona, St. George, Utah and Flagstaff, Arizona. Due to the rugged and inhospitable topography through which the river flows, there are only a few major towns along the Colorado River itself, including Grand Junction, Colorado and Yuma, Arizona.

Geology
As recently as the Cretaceous period about 100 million years ago, much of western North America was still part of the Pacific Ocean. Tectonic forces from the collision of the Farallon Plate with the North American Plate pushed up the Rocky Mountains between 50 and 75 million years ago in a mountain-building episode known as the Laramide orogeny. The Colorado River first formed as a west-flowing stream draining the southwestern portion of the range, and the uplift also diverted the Green River, once a tributary of the Mississippi River, west towards the Colorado. About 30 to 20 million years ago, volcanic activity related to the orogeny led to the Mid-Tertiary ignimbrite flare-up, which created smaller formations such as the Chiricahua Mountains in Arizona and deposited massive amounts of volcanic ash and debris over the watershed. The Colorado Plateau first began to rise during the Eocene, between about 55 and 34 million years ago, but did not attain its present height until about 5 million years ago, about when the Colorado River established its present course into the Gulf of California.

The time scale and sequence over which the river's present course and the Grand Canyon were formed is uncertain. Before the Gulf of California was formed around 12 to 5 million years ago by faulting processes along the boundary of the North American and Pacific plates, the Colorado flowed west to an outlet on the Pacific Ocean—possibly Monterey Bay on the Central California coast, and may have played a role in the formation of the Monterey submarine canyon. Crustal extension in the Basin and Range Province began about 20 million years ago and the modern Sierra Nevada began forming about 10 million years ago, eventually diverting the Colorado southwards towards the Gulf. As the Colorado Plateau continued to rise between 5 and 2.5 million years ago, the river maintained its ancestral course (as an antecedent stream) and began to cut the Grand Canyon. Antecedence played a major part in shaping other peculiar geographic features in the watershed, including the Dolores River's bisection of Paradox Valley in Colorado and the Green River's cut through the Uinta Mountains in Utah.

Since then the river has changed course into the Salton Sink at least three times, transforming it into Lake Cahuilla, which at maximum size flooded up the valley to present-day Indio, California. The lake took about 50 years to evaporate after the Colorado resumed flowing to the Gulf. The present-day Salton Sea can be considered the most recent incarnation of Lake Cahuilla, though on a much smaller scale.

Between 1.8 million and 10,000 years ago, massive flows of basalt from the Uinkaret volcanic field in northern Arizona dammed the Colorado River within the Grand Canyon. The lack of associated sediment deposits along this stretch of the Colorado River, which would have accumulated in the impounded lakes over time, suggests that most of these dams did not survive for more than a few decades before collapsing or being washed away. Failure of the lava dams caused by erosion, leaks and cavitation caused catastrophic floods, which may have been some of the largest ever to occur in North America, rivaling the late-Pleistocene Missoula Floods of the northwestern United States.

History

Indigenous peoples

The first humans of the Colorado River basin were likely Paleo-Indians of the Clovis and Folsom cultures, who first arrived on the Colorado Plateau about 12,000 years ago. Very little human activity occurred in the watershed until the rise of the Desert Archaic Culture, which from 8,000 to 2,000 years ago constituted most of the region's human population. These prehistoric inhabitants led a generally nomadic lifestyle, gathering plants and hunting small animals (though some of the earliest peoples hunted larger mammals that became extinct in North America after the end of the Pleistocene epoch). Another notable early group was the Fremont culture, whose peoples inhabited the Colorado Plateau from 2,000 to 700 years ago. The Fremont were likely the first peoples of the Colorado River basin to domesticate crops and construct masonry dwellings; they also left behind a large amount of rock art and petroglyphs, many of which have survived to the present day.

Beginning in the early centuries A.D., Colorado River basin peoples began to form large agriculture-based societies, some of which lasted hundreds of years and grew into well-organized civilizations encompassing tens of thousands of inhabitants. The Ancient Puebloan (also known as Anasazi or Hisatsinom) people of the Four Corners region were descended from the Desert Archaic culture. The Puebloan people developed a complex distribution system to supply drinking and irrigation water in Chaco Canyon in northwestern New Mexico.

The Puebloans dominated the basin of the San Juan River, and the center of their civilization was in Chaco Canyon. In Chaco Canyon and the surrounding lands, they built more than 150 multi-story pueblos or "great houses", the largest of which, Pueblo Bonito, is composed of more than 600 rooms. The Hohokam culture was present along the middle Gila River beginning around 1 A.D. Between 600 and 700 A.D. they began to employ irrigation on a large scale, and did so more prolifically than any other native group in the Colorado River basin. Both civilizations supported large populations at their height; the Chaco Canyon Puebloans numbered between 6,000 and 15,000 and estimates for the Hohokam range between 30,000 and 200,000.

Megadrought in 14th century
These sedentary peoples heavily exploited their surroundings, practicing logging and harvesting of other resources on a large scale. The construction of irrigation canals may have led to a significant change in the morphology of many waterways in the Colorado River basin. Prior to human contact, rivers such as the Gila, Salt and Chaco were shallow perennial streams with low, vegetated banks and large floodplains. In time, flash floods caused significant downcutting on irrigation canals, which in turn led to the entrenchment of the original streams into arroyos, making agriculture difficult. A variety of methods were employed to combat these problems, including the construction of large dams, but when a megadrought hit the region in the 14th century A.D. the ancient civilizations of the Colorado River basin abruptly collapsed. Some Puebloans migrated to the Rio Grande Valley of central New Mexico and south-central Colorado, becoming the predecessors of the Hopi, Zuni, Laguna and Acoma people in western New Mexico. Many of the tribes that inhabited the Colorado River basin at the time of European contact were descended from Puebloan and Hohokam survivors, while others already had a long history of living in the region or migrated in from bordering lands.

The Navajo were an Athabaskan people who migrated from the north into the Colorado River basin around 1025 A.D. They soon established themselves as the dominant Native American tribe in the Colorado River basin, and their territory stretched over parts of present-day Arizona, New Mexico, Utah and Colorado – in the original homelands of the Puebloans. In fact, the Navajo acquired agricultural skills from the Puebloans before the collapse of the Pueblo civilization in the 14th century. A profusion of other tribes have made a continued, lasting presence along the Colorado River. The Mohave have lived along the rich bottomlands of the lower Colorado below Black Canyon since 1200 A.D. They were fishermen—navigating the river on rafts made of reeds to catch Gila trout and Colorado pikeminnow— and farmers, relying on the annual floods of the river rather than irrigation to water their crops. Ute peoples have inhabited the northern Colorado River basin, mainly in present-day Colorado, Wyoming and Utah, for at least 2,000 years, but did not become well established in the Four Corners area until 1500 A.D. The Apache, Cocopah, Halchidhoma, Havasupai, Hualapai, Maricopa, Pima, and Quechan are among many other groups that live along or had territories bordering on the Colorado River and its tributaries.

Europeans arrive
Beginning in the 17th century, contact with Europeans brought significant changes to the lifestyles of Native Americans in the Colorado River basin. Missionaries sought to convert indigenous peoples to Christianity – an effort sometimes successful, such as in Father Eusebio Francisco Kino's 1694 encounter with the "docile Pimas of the Gila Valley [who] readily accepted Kino and his Christian teachings". From 1694 to 1702 Kino would explore the Gila and Colorado Rivers to determine if California was an island or peninsula. The Spanish introduced sheep and goats to the Navajo, who came to rely heavily on them for meat, milk and wool. By the mid-16th century, the Utes, having acquired horses from the Spanish, introduced them to the Colorado River basin. The use of horses spread through the basin via trade between the various tribes and greatly facilitated hunting, communications, travel and warfare for indigenous peoples. The more aggressive tribes, such as the Utes and Navajos, often used horses to their advantage in raids against tribes that were slower to adopt them, such as the Goshutes and Southern Paiutes.

The gradual influx of European and American explorers, fortune seekers and settlers into the region eventually led to conflicts that forced many Native Americans off their traditional lands. After the acquisition of the Colorado River basin from Mexico in the Mexican–American War in 1846, U.S. military forces commanded by Kit Carson forced more than 8,000 Navajo men, women and children from their homes after a series of unsuccessful attempts to confine their territory, many of which were met with violent resistance. In what is now known as the Long Walk of the Navajo, the captives were marched from Arizona to Fort Sumner in New Mexico, and many died along the route. Four years later, the Navajo signed a treaty that moved them onto a reservation in the Four Corners region that is now known as the Navajo Nation. It is the largest Native American reservation in the United States, encompassing  with a population of over 180,000 as of 2000.

Mohave expelled
The Mohave were expelled from their territory after a series of minor skirmishes and raids on wagon trains passing through the area in the late 1850s, culminating in an 1859 battle with American forces that concluded the Mohave War. In 1870, the Mohave were relocated to a reservation at Fort Mojave, which spans the borders of Arizona, California and Nevada. Some Mohave were also moved to the  Colorado River Indian Reservation on the Arizona–California border, originally established for the Mohave and Chemehuevi people in 1865. In the 1940s, some Hopi and Navajo people were also relocated to this reservation. The four tribes now form a geopolitical body known as the Colorado River Indian Tribes.

Water rights of Native Americans in the Colorado River basin were largely ignored during the extensive water resources development carried out on the river and its tributaries in the 19th and 20th centuries. The construction of dams has often had negative impacts on tribal peoples, such as the Chemehuevi when their riverside lands were flooded after the completion of Parker Dam in 1938. Ten Native American tribes in the basin now hold or continue to claim water rights to the Colorado River. The U.S. government has taken some actions to help quantify and develop the water resources of Native American reservations. The first federally funded irrigation project in the U.S. was the construction of an irrigation canal on the Colorado River Indian Reservation in 1867. Other water projects include the Navajo Indian Irrigation Project, authorized in 1962 for the irrigation of lands in part of the Navajo Nation in north-central New Mexico. The Navajo continue to seek expansion of their water rights because of difficulties with the water supply on their reservation; about 40 percent of its inhabitants must haul water by truck many miles to their homes. In the 21st century, they have filed legal claims against the governments of Arizona, New Mexico and Utah for increased water rights. Some of these claims have been successful for the Navajo, such as a 2004 settlement in which they received a  allotment from New Mexico.

Early explorers

During the 16th century, the Spanish began to explore and colonize western North America. An early motive was the search for the Seven Cities of Gold, or "Cibola", rumored to have been built by Native Americans somewhere in the desert Southwest. According to a United States Geological Survey publication, it is likely that Francisco de Ulloa was the first European to see the Colorado River when in 1536 he sailed to the head of the Gulf of California. Francisco Vásquez de Coronado's 1540–1542 expedition began as a search for the fabled Cities of Gold, but after learning from natives in New Mexico of a large river to the west, he sent García López de Cárdenas to lead a small contingent to find it. With the guidance of Hopi Indians, Cárdenas and his men became the first outsiders to see the Grand Canyon. After failing at an attempt to descend to the river, they left the area, defeated by the difficult terrain and torrid weather.

In 1540, Hernando de Alarcón and his fleet reached the mouth of the river, intending to provide additional supplies to Coronado's expedition. Alarcón may have sailed the Colorado as far upstream as the present-day California–Arizona border. Coronado never reached the Gulf of California, and Alarcón eventually gave up and left. Melchior Díaz reached the delta in the same year, intending to establish contact with Alarcón, but the latter was already gone by the time of Díaz's arrival. Díaz named the Colorado River Rio del Tizon ("Firebrand River") after seeing a practice used by the local natives for warming themselves. The name Tizon lasted for the next 200 years. The name Rio Colorado ("Red River") was first applied to the Colorado by Father Eusebio Francisco Kino in his maps and written reports resulting from his explorations to the Colorado River Delta and his discovery that California was not an island but a peninsula (1700–1702). Kino's 1701 map, "Paso por Tierra a la California," is the first known map to label the river as the Colorado.

During the 18th and early 19th centuries, many Americans and Spanish believed in the existence of the Buenaventura River, purported to run from the Rocky Mountains in Utah or Colorado to the Pacific Ocean. The name Buenaventura was given to the Green River by Silvestre Vélez de Escalante as early as 1776, but Escalante did not know that the Green drained to the Colorado. Many later maps showed the headwaters of the Green and Colorado rivers connecting with the Sevier River (Rio San Ysabel) and Utah Lake (Lake Timpanogos) before flowing west through the Sierra Nevada into California. Mountain man Jedediah Smith reached the lower Colorado by way of the Virgin River canyon in 1826. Smith called the Colorado the "Seedskeedee", as the Green River in Wyoming was known to fur trappers, correctly believing it to be a continuation of the Green and not a separate river as others believed under the Buenaventura myth. John C. Frémont's 1843 Great Basin expedition proved that no river traversed the Great Basin and Sierra Nevada, officially debunking the Buenaventura myth.

Exploration and navigation below Fort Yuma, 1850–1854
Between 1850 and 1854 the U. S. Army explored the lower reach of the Colorado River from the Gulf of California, looking for the river to provide a less expensive route to supply the remote post of Fort Yuma. First in November 1850 to January 1851, by its transport schooner, Invincible under Captain Alfred H. Wilcox and then by its longboat commanded by Lieutenant George Derby. Later Lieutenant Derby, in his expedition report, recommended that a shallow draft sternwheel steamboat would be the way to send supplies up river to the fort.

The next contractors George Alonzo Johnson with his partner Benjamin M. Hartshorne, brought two barges and 250 tons of supplies arriving at the river's mouth in February 1852, on the United States transport schooner Sierra Nevada under Captain Wilcox. Poling the barges up the Colorado, the first barge sank with its cargo a total loss. The second was finally, after a long struggle poled up to Fort Yuma, but what little it carried was soon consumed by the garrison. Subsequently, wagons again were sent from the fort to haul the balance of the supplies overland from the estuary through the marshes and woodlands of the Delta.

At last Derby's recommendation was heeded and in November 1852, the Uncle Sam, a 65-foot-long side-wheel paddle steamer, built by Domingo Marcucci, became the first steamboat on the Colorado River.  It was brought by the schooner Capacity from San Francisco to the delta by the next contractor to supply the fort, Captain James Turnbull. It was assembled and launched in the estuary, 30 miles above the mouth of the Colorado River. Equipped with only a 20-horsepower engine, the Uncle Sam could only carry 35 tons of supplies, taking 15 days to make the first 120-mile trip. It made many trips up and down the river, taking four months to finish carrying the supplies for the fort, improving its time up river to 12 days. Negligence caused it to sink at its dock below Fort Yuma, and was then washed away before it could be raised, in the spring flood of 1853. Turnbull in financial difficulty, disappeared. Nevertheless, he had shown the worth of steamboats to solve Fort Yuma's supply problem.

George Alonzo Johnson with his partner Hartshorne and a new partner Captain Alfred H. Wilcox (formerly of the Invincible and Sierra Nevada), formed George A. Johnson & Company and obtained the next contract to supply the fort. Johnson and his partners, all having learned lessons from their failed attempts ascending the Colorado and with the example of the Uncle Sam, brought the parts of a more powerful side-wheel steamboat, the General Jesup, with them to the mouth of the Colorado from San Francisco. There it was reassembled at a landing in the upper tidewater of the river and reached Fort Yuma, January 18, 1854. This new boat, capable of carrying 50 tons of cargo, was very successful making round trips from the estuary to the fort in only four or five days. Costs were cut from $200 to $75 per ton.

Exploration and navigation above Fort Yuma, 1851–1887

Lorenzo Sitgreaves led the first Corps of Topographical Engineers mission across northern Arizona to the Colorado River (near modern Bullhead City, Arizona), and down its east bank to the river crossings of the Southern Immigrant Trail at Fort Yuma in 1851.

The second Corps of Topographical Engineers expedition passed along and crossed the Colorado was the 1853–1854 Pacific Railroad Survey expedition along the 35th parallel north from Oklahoma to Los Angeles, led by Lt. Amiel Weeks Whipple.

George A. Johnson was instrumental in getting the support for Congressional funding a military expedition up the river. With those funds Johnson expected to provide the transportation for the expedition but was angry and disappointed when the commander of the expedition Lt. Joseph Christmas Ives rejected his offer of one of his steamboats. Before Ives could finish reassembling his steamer in the delta, George A. Johnson set off from Fort Yuma on December 31, 1857, conducting his own exploration of the river above the fort in his steamboat General Jesup. Running low on food he turned back. As he returned he encountered Lieutenant Ives, Whipple's assistant, who was leading an expedition to explore the feasibility of using the Colorado River as a navigation route in the Southwest. Ives and his men used a specially built steamboat, the shallow-draft U.S.S. Explorer, and traveled up the river as far as Black Canyon. He then took a small boat up beyond the canyon to Fortification Rock and Las Vegas Wash. After experiencing numerous groundings and accidents and having been inhibited by low water in the river, Ives declared: "Ours has been the first, and will doubtless be the last, party of whites to visit this profitless locality. It seems intended by nature that the Colorado River, along the greater portion of its lonely and majestic way, shall be forever unvisited and undisturbed."

Until 1866, El Dorado Canyon was the actual head of navigation on the Colorado River. In that year Captain Robert T. Rogers, commanding the steamer Esmeralda with a barge and ninety tons of freight, reached Callville, Nevada, on October 8, 1866.  Callville remained the head of navigation on the river until July 7, 1879, when Captain J. A. Mellon in the Gila left El Dorado Canyon landing, steamed up through the rapids in Black Canyon, making record time to Callville and tied up overnight. Next morning he to steamed up through the rapids in Boulder Canyon to reach the mouth of the Virgin River at Rioville July 8, 1879. From 1879 to 1887, Rioville, Nevada was the high water Head of Navigation for the steamboats and the mining company sloop Sou'Wester that carried the salt needed for the reduction of silver ore from there to the mills at El Dorado Canyon.

Powell's expeditions, 1869–1871
Up until the mid-19th century, long stretches of the Colorado and Green rivers between Wyoming and Nevada remained largely unexplored due to their remote location and dangers of navigation. Because of the dramatic drop in elevation of the two rivers, there were rumors of huge waterfalls and violent rapids, and Native American tales strengthened their credibility. In 1869, one-armed Civil War veteran John Wesley Powell led an expedition from Green River Station in Wyoming, aiming to run the two rivers all the way down to St. Thomas, Nevada, near present-day Hoover Dam. Powell and nine men – none of whom had prior whitewater experience – set out in May. After braving the rapids of the Gates of Lodore, Cataract Canyon and other gorges along the Colorado, the party arrived at the mouth of the Little Colorado River, where Powell noted down arguably the most famous words ever written about the Grand Canyon of the Colorado:

On August 28, 1869, three men deserted the expedition, convinced that they could not possibly survive the trip through the Grand Canyon. They were allegedly killed by Native Americans after making it to the rim of the canyon; two days later, the expedition ran the last of the Grand Canyon rapids and reached St. Thomas. Powell led a second expedition in 1871, this time with financial backing from the U.S. government. The explorers named many features along the Colorado and Green rivers, including Glen Canyon, the Dirty Devil River, Flaming Gorge, and the Gates of Lodore. In what is perhaps a twist of irony, modern-day Lake Powell, which floods Glen Canyon, is also named for their leader.

American settlement

Starting in the latter half of the 19th century, the lower Colorado below Black Canyon became an important waterway for steamboat commerce. In 1852, the Uncle Sam was launched to provide supplies to the U.S. Army outpost at Fort Yuma. Although this vessel accidentally foundered and sank early in its career, commercial traffic quickly proliferated because river transport was much cheaper than hauling freight over land. The tidal bore of the lower Colorado also presented a major hazard; in 1922, a -high wave swamped a ship bound for Yuma, killing between 86 and 130 people. Steamboats quickly became the principal source of communication and trade along the river until competition from railroads began in the 1870s, and finally the construction of dams along the lower river in 1909, none of which had locks to allow the passage of ships.

During the Manifest Destiny era of the mid-19th century, American pioneers settled many western states but generally avoided the Colorado River basin until the 1850s. Under Brigham Young's grand vision for a "vast empire in the desert", (the State of Deseret) Mormon settlers were among the first whites to establish a permanent presence in the watershed, Fort Clara or Fort Santa Clara, in the winter of 1855–1856 along the Santa Clara River, tributary of the Virgin River. In the lower Colorado mining was the primary spur to economic development, copper mining in southwestern New Mexico Territory the 1850s then the Mohave War and a gold rush on the Gila River in 1859, the El Dorado Canyon Rush in 1860 and Colorado River Gold Rush in 1862.

In 1860, anticipating the American Civil War, the Mormons established a number of settlements to grow cotton along the Virgin River in Washington County, Utah. From 1863 to 1865, Mormon colonists founded St. Thomas and other colonies on the Muddy and Virgin rivers in northwestern Arizona Territory, (now Clark County, Nevada).  Stone's Ferry was established by these colonists on the Colorado at the mouth of the Virgin River to carry their produce on a wagon road to the mining districts of Mohave County, Arizona to the south. Also, in 1866, a steamboat landing was established at Callville, intended as an outlet to the Pacific Ocean via the Colorado River, for Mormon settlements in the Great Basin. These settlements reached a peak population of about 600 before being abandoned in 1871, and for nearly a decade these valleys became a haven for outlaws and cattle rustlers.  One Mormon settler Daniel Bonelli, remained, operating the ferry and began mining salt in nearby mines, bring it in barges, down river to El Dorado Canyon where it was used to process silver ore. From 1879 to 1887, Colorado Steam Navigation Company steamboats carried the salt, operating up river in the high spring flood waters, through Boulder Canyon, to the landing at Rioville at the mouth of the Virgin River. From 1879 to 1882 the Southwestern Mining Company, largest in El Dorado Canyon, brought in a 56-foot sloop the Sou'Wester that sailed up and down river carrying the salt in the low water time of year until it was wrecked in the Quick and Dirty Rapids of Black Canyon.

Mormons founded settlements along the Duchesne River Valley in the 1870s, and populated the Little Colorado River valley later in the century, settling in towns such as St. Johns, Arizona. They also established settlements along the Gila River in central Arizona beginning in 1871. These early settlers were impressed by the extensive ruins of the Hohokam civilization that previously occupied the Gila River valley, and are said to have "envisioned their new agricultural civilization rising as the mythical phoenix bird from the ashes of Hohokam society". The Mormons were the first whites to develop the water resources of the basin on a large scale, and built complex networks of dams and canals to irrigate wheat, oats and barley in addition to establishing extensive sheep and cattle ranches.

One of the main reasons the Mormons were able to colonize Arizona was the existence of Jacob Hamblin's ferry across the Colorado at Lee's Ferry (then known as Pahreah Crossing), which began running in March 1864. This location was the only section of river for hundreds of miles in both directions where the canyon walls dropped away, allowing for the development of a transport route. John Doyle Lee established a more permanent ferry system at the site in 1870. One reason Lee chose to run the ferry was to flee from Mormon leaders who held him responsible for the Mountain Meadows massacre, in which 120 emigrants in a wagon train were killed by a local militia disguised as Native Americans. Even though it was located along a major travel route, Lee's Ferry was very isolated, and there Lee and his family established the aptly named Lonely Dell Ranch. In 1928, the ferry sank, resulting in the deaths of three men.

Gold strikes from the mid-19th to early 20th centuries played a major role in attracting settlers to the upper Colorado River basin. In 1859, a group of adventurers from Georgia discovered gold along the Blue River in Colorado and established the mining boomtown of Breckenridge. During 1875, even bigger strikes were made along the Uncompahgre and San Miguel rivers, also in Colorado, and these led to the creation of Ouray and Telluride, respectively. Because most gold deposits along the upper Colorado River and its tributaries occur in lode deposits, extensive mining systems and heavy machinery were required to extract them. Mining remains a substantial contributor to the economy of the upper basin and has led to acid mine drainage problems in some regional streams and rivers.

The Colorado River region in Mexico became favored place for Americans to invest in agriculture in the late nineteenth century when Mexico President Porfirio Díaz welcomed foreign capital to develop the country. The Colorado River Land Company, formed by Los Angeles Times publisher Harry Chandler, his father-in-law Harrison Gray Otis, and others, developed the Mexicali Valley in Baja California as a thriving land company. The company headquarters was nominally based in Mexico, but its real headquarters was in Los Angeles, California. Land was leased mainly to Americans who were required to develop it. Colorado River was used to irrigate the rich soil. The company largely escaped the turmoil of the Mexican Revolution (1910–20), but in the postrevolutionary period, the Mexican government expropriated the company's land to satisfy the demand for land reform.

Naming of the upper Colorado River and controversy
Prior to 1921, the upper Colorado River above the confluence with the Green River in Utah had assumed various names. Fathers Dominguez and Escalante named it Rio San Rafael in 1776. Through the mid-1800s, the river between Green River and the Gunnison River was most commonly known as the Grand River. The river above the junction with the Gunnison River, however, was known variously as the Bunkara River, the North Fork of the Grand River, the Blue River, and the Grand River. The latter name did not become consistently applied until the 1870s.

In 1921, U.S. Representative Edward T. Taylor of Colorado petitioned the Congressional Committee on Interstate and Foreign Commerce to rename the Grand River as the Colorado River. Taylor saw the fact that the Colorado River started outside the border of his state as an "abomination". On July 25, the name change was made official in House Joint Resolution 460 of the 66th Congress, over the objections of representatives from Wyoming, Utah, and the USGS, which noted that the Green River was much longer and had a larger drainage basin above its confluence with the Grand River, although the Grand contributed a greater flow of water.

Engineering and development

About 40 million people depend on the Colorado River's water for agricultural, industrial and domestic needs. The Colorado irrigates 5.5 million acres (2.2 million hectares) of farmland, and its hydroelectric plants produce 12 billion kilowatt hours (KWh) of hydroelectricity each year. Hydroelectricity from the Colorado is a key supplier of peaking power on the Southwest electric grid. Often called "America's Nile", the Colorado is so intensively managed that each drop of its water is used an average of 17 times in a single year. Southern Nevada Water Authority has called the Colorado River one of the "most controlled, controversial and litigated rivers in the world".

In 1922, six U.S. states signed the Colorado River Compact, which divided half of the river's flow to both the Upper Basin (the drainage area above Lee's Ferry, comprising parts of Colorado, New Mexico, Utah, and Wyoming and a small portion of Arizona) and the Lower Basin (Arizona, California, Nevada, and parts of New Mexico and Utah). The Upper and Lower Basin were each allocated  of water per year, a figure believed to represent half of the river's annual flow at Lee's Ferry. The allotments operated under the premise that approximately 17.5 million acre-feet of water flowed through the river annually.

Arizona initially refused to ratify the compact because it feared that California would take too much of the lower basin allotment. In 1944 a compromise was reached in which Arizona was allocated , but with the caveat that California's  allocation was prioritized during drought years. These and nine other decisions, compacts, federal acts and agreements made between 1922 and 1973 constitute what is now known as the Law of the River.

In 1944, a treaty between the U.S. and Mexico allocated  of Colorado River water to Mexico each year. Morelos Dam was constructed in 1950 to enable Mexico to utilize its share of the river. Water allocated to Mexico from the Colorado River is regulated by the International Boundary and Water Commission, which also apportions waters from the Rio Grande between the two countries.

Transmountain diversions
Large-scale development of Colorado River water supplies started in the late 19th century, at the river's headwaters in La Poudre Pass. The Grand Ditch, directing runoff from the river's headwaters across the Continental Divide to arid eastern Colorado, was considered an engineering marvel when completed in 1890. This was the first of twenty-four "transmountain diversions" constructed to draw water across the Rocky Mountains as the Front Range corridor increased in population. These diversions draw water from the upper Colorado and its tributaries into the South Platte River, Arkansas River and Rio Grande basins. Today, about 80 percent of Colorado's population lives on the Eastern Slope of the Rockies, while 80 percent of precipitation falls on the Western Slope.

While first planned at the same time as the Grand Ditch, construction on the Colorado-Big Thompson Project (C-BT) did not begin until the 1930s. Numerous other projects followed, with the largest including the Roberts Tunnel, which delivers water from the Blue River to the city of Denver, and the Fryingpan–Arkansas Project, which diverts water from the Fryingpan River to the Arkansas River basin.

Historically, most of the water has been used for irrigation, although water usage is increasing for urban water supply and for recreational purposes such as snowmaking and increasing Eastern Slope streamflows for boating and fishing. Denver Water receives about 50 percent of its supply from the Colorado River basin. However, diversions have caused environmental harm to the upper Colorado River system by reducing streamflows in many tributaries. A number of reservoirs have been built to offset the impact of transmountain diversions by storing water for dry season release on the Western Slope, including Williams Fork Reservoir in 1959 and Wolford Mountain Reservoir in 1996.

The Imperial Valley disaster

In 1900, the California Development Company (CDC) envisioned irrigating the Imperial Valley, a then dry basin on the California–Mexico border, using water from the Colorado River. Due to the valley's location below sea level, water could be diverted and allowed to flow there entirely by gravity. Engineer George Chaffey was hired to design the Alamo Canal, which split from the Colorado near Pilot Knob, California and ran south into Mexico, where it joined the Alamo River, a dry arroyo which had historically carried overflowing floodwaters from the Colorado into the Salton Sink at the bottom of Imperial Valley.

The Alamo Canal experienced continual problems due to the Colorado's high sediment content and its varying water levels. During low flows, the river often dropped below the level of the canal intake, while high flows silted up the intake, forcing the repeated excavation of new cuts. In early 1905, flooding destroyed the intake gates and water began to flow uncontrolled down the canal towards the Salton Sink. By August, the breach had grown large enough to swallow the entire flow of the river, which began to flood the bottom of the valley. The Southern Pacific Railroad attempted to dam the flow in order to protect their tracks which ran through the valley, but was hampered by repeated flooding. It took seven attempts, more than $3 million, and two years for the railroad, the CDC, and the federal government to permanently block the breach and restore the river's original course – but not before part of the Imperial Valley was flooded under a  lake, today's Salton Sea. The Imperial Valley fiasco demonstrated that further economic development of the region would require a dam to control the Colorado's unpredictable flows.

Boulder Canyon Project

A large dam on the Colorado River had been envisioned since the 1920s. On September 30, 1935, Hoover Dam was completed, forming Lake Mead, capable of holding more than two years of the Colorado's flow. Lake Mead was, and still is, the largest artificial lake in the U.S. by storage capacity. The construction of Hoover Dam stabilized the lower channel of the Colorado River, stored water for irrigation in times of drought, captured sediment and controlled floods. Hoover was the tallest dam in the world at the time of construction and also had the world's largest hydroelectric power plant.

The Boulder Canyon Project Act also authorized the All-American Canal, which was built as a permanent replacement for the Alamo Canal and follows a route entirely within the U.S. on its way to the Imperial Valley. The Coachella Canal, which branches northward from the All-American Canal, irrigates another  in the Coachella Valley.

Parker Dam was initially built as the diversion point for the Colorado River Aqueduct, planned by the Metropolitan Water District of Southern California to supply water to Los Angeles. The construction of the dam was opposed by Arizona, which feared that California would take too much water from the Colorado; at one point, Arizona sent members of its National Guard to stop work on the dam. Ultimately, a compromise was reached, with Arizona dropping its objections in exchange for the USBR constructing the Gila Project, which irrigates  on the Arizona side of the river. The aqueduct enabled the continued growth of Los Angeles and its suburbs, and provides water to about 10 million people today. The San Diego Aqueduct, which branches off from the Colorado River Aqueduct in Riverside County, California, opened in stages between 1954–1971 and provides water to another 3 million people in the San Diego metro area.

The Las Vegas Valley of Nevada experienced rapid growth after Hoover Dam, and by 1937 Las Vegas had tapped a pipeline into Lake Mead. Nevada officials, believing that groundwater resources in the southern part of the state were sufficient for future growth, were more concerned with securing a large amount of the dam's power supply than water from the Colorado; thus they settled for the smallest water allocation of all the states in the Colorado River Compact. In 2018, due to declining water levels in Lake Mead, a second pipeline was completed with a lower intake elevation.

Colorado River Storage Project

In the first half of the 20th century, the Upper Basin states, with the exception of Colorado, had developed very little of their water allocations from the Colorado River Compact. By the 1950s, however, water demand was rapidly increasing in Utah's Wasatch Front (Salt Lake City metro area) and the Rio Grande Valley of New Mexico, which both began exploring ways to divert water from the Colorado Basin. The Upper Basin states were concerned that they would not be able to use their full Compact allocations due to increasing water demands in the Lower Basin. The Compact requires the Upper Basin to deliver a minimum annual flow of  past Lee's Ferry (measured on a 10-year rolling average). Without additional reservoir storage, the Upper Basin states could not utilize their allocations without impacting water deliveries to the Lower Basin in dry years.

In 1956 Congress authorized the USBR to construct the Colorado River Storage Project (CRSP), which planned several large reservoirs on the upper Colorado, Green, Gunnison and San Juan Rivers. The initial blueprints for the CRSP included two dams on the Green River within Echo Park Canyon in Dinosaur National Monument – a move criticized by both the National Park Service and environmental groups such as the Sierra Club. The controversy received nationwide media attention, and the USBR dropped its plans for the Dinosaur dams in exchange for increasing the size of a proposed dam at Glen Canyon.

The controversy associated with Glen Canyon Dam did not build momentum until construction was well underway. Due to Glen Canyon's remote location, most of the American public did not even know of its existence; the few who did contended that it had much greater scenic value than Echo Park. Sierra Club leader David Brower fought the dam both during the construction and for many years afterwards until his death in 2000. Brower believed that he was personally responsible for the failure to prevent Glen Canyon's flooding, calling it his "greatest mistake, greatest sin".

In addition to Glen Canyon Dam, the CRSP includes the Flaming Gorge Dam on the Green River, the Blue Mesa, Morrow Point and Crystal Dams on the Gunnison River, and the Navajo Dam on the San Juan River. A total of 22 "participating projects" (of which 16 have been constructed) were later authorized in order to develop local water supplies at various locations across the Upper Basin states. Both are multi-purpose projects serving a variety of agricultural, municipal and industrial uses.

Pacific Southwest Water Plan

By the middle of the 20th century, planners were concerned that continued growth in water demand would outstrip the available water supply from the Colorado River. After exploring a multitude of potential projects, the USBR published a study in January 1964 known as the Pacific Southwest Water Plan, which proposed diverting water from the northwestern United States into the Colorado River basin. Arizona's water allocation was a significant focus of the plan, due to the growing concern that its water supply could be curtailed due to California's seniority of water rights. In addition, the plan would guarantee full water supplies to Nevada, California and Mexico, allowing the Upper Basin states to utilize their full allocations without risking reductions in the Lower Basin.  The project would cost an estimated $3.1 billion.

The first stage of this plan would divert water from Northern California's Trinity, Klamath and Eel Rivers to Southern California, allowing more Colorado River water to be used, by exchange, in Arizona. A canal system, which ultimately would become the Central Arizona Project (CAP), would be constructed to deliver Arizona's Colorado River allocation to Phoenix and Tucson, both located far away from the Colorado River in the middle of the state. At this point, central Arizona was still entirely dependent on local water supplies, such as the 1911 Theodore Roosevelt Dam,  and was quickly running out of surplus water.

In order to supply the massive amount of power required to pump Colorado River water to central Arizona, two hydroelectric dams were proposed in the Grand Canyon (Bridge Canyon Dam and Marble Canyon Dam), which while not directly located in Grand Canyon National Park, would greatly impact flows of the Colorado River through the park. With the controversy over Glen Canyon Dam still ongoing, the public pressure against these dams was immense. As a result, the two Grand Canyon dams were omitted from the final CAP authorization in 1968. In addition, the boundaries of Grand Canyon National Park were redrawn to prevent future dam projects in the area. The pumping power was replaced by the building of the coal-fired Navajo Generating Station near Page, Arizona, in 1976. In 2019, the Navajo Generating Station ceased operation.

The CAP was constructed in stages from 1973 to 1993, ultimately extending  from the Colorado River at Parker Dam to Tucson, Arizona. It delivers  of water per year, irrigates  of farmland and provides municipal water to about 5 million people. Due to environmental concerns, most of the facilities proposed in the Pacific Southwest Water Plan were never built (though a smaller version of the Trinity River project was constructed as part of the unrelated Central Valley Project), leaving Arizona and Nevada vulnerable to future water reductions under the Compact.

Uncertain future

When the Colorado River Compact was drafted in the 1920s, it was based on barely 30 years of streamflow records that suggested an average annual flow of  past Lee's Ferry. This has resulted in more water being allocated to river users than actually exists in the Colorado. Droughts have exacerbated the issue of water over-allocation.

The most severe drought on record, the southwestern North American megadrought, began in the early 21st century, in which the river basin has produced above-average runoff in only five years between 2000 and 2021. The region is experiencing a warming trend, which is accompanied by earlier snowmelt, lower precipitation and greater evapotranspiration. A 2004 study showed that a 1–6 percent decrease of precipitation would lead to runoff declining by as much as 18 percent by 2050.

Since 2000, reservoir levels have fluctuated greatly from year to year, but have experienced a steady long-term decline. The particularly dry spell between 2000 and 2004 brought Lake Powell to just a third of capacity in 2005, the lowest level on record since initial filling in 1969. Due to Arizona and Nevada's water rights being junior to California's, their allocations can legally be cut to zero before any reductions are made on the California side.

A wet winter in 2011 temporarily raised lake levels, but dry conditions returned in the next two years. In 2014, the Bureau of Reclamation cut releases from Lake Powell by 10 percent —the first such reduction since the 1960s, when Lake Powell was being filled for the first time. This resulted in Lake Mead dropping to its lowest recorded level since 1937, when it was first being filled.

Water year 2018 had a much lower-than-average snowpack. In July 2021, after two more extremely dry winters, Lake Powell fell below the previous low set in 2005. In response, the Bureau of Reclamation began releasing water from upstream reservoirs in order to keep Powell above the minimum level for hydropower generation. Lake Mead fell below the  level expected to trigger federally mandated cuts to Arizona and Nevada's water supplies for the first time in history, and is expected to continue declining into 2022.

On August 16, 2021, the Bureau of Reclamation released the Colorado River Basin August 2021 24-Month Study, and for the first time declared a shortage and that because of "ongoing historic drought and low runoff conditions in the Colorado River Basin, downstream releases from Glen Canyon Dam and Hoover Dam will be reduced in 2022 due to declining reservoir levels."
The Lower Basin reductions will reduce the annual apportionments – Arizona's by 18 percent, Nevada's by 7 percent, and Mexico's by 5 percent.

On June 14, 2022, Bureau of Reclamation Commissioner Camille Touton told the Senate Committee on Energy and Natural resources that additional cuts of 2-4 million acre-feet were required to stabilize reservoir levels in 2023. Touton warned that if states were unable to negotiate the requisite cuts the Interior department may use its legal authority to cut releases. When the states were unable to come to an agreement about how to share the proposed cuts, Reclamation began the legal steps to unilaterally reduce releases from Hoover and Glen Canyon Dams in 2023. As of December 2022 the lower basin states of Nevada, Arizona, and California had not agreed on how to reduce water use by the approximately 30% required to keep levels in lakes Mead and Powell from crashing. The Bureau of Reclamation has projected that water levels at Lake Powell could fall low enough that by July 2023 Glen Canyon dam would no longer be able to generate any hydropower.

Ecology

Wildlife and plants

The Colorado River and its tributaries often nourish extensive corridors of riparian growth as they traverse the arid desert regions of the watershed. Although riparian zones represent a relatively small proportion of the basin and have been affected by engineering projects and river diversion in many places, they have the greatest biodiversity of any habitat in the basin. The most prominent riparian zones along the river occur along the lower Colorado below Davis Dam, especially in the Colorado River Delta, where riparian areas support 358 species of birds despite the reduction in freshwater flow and invasive plants such as tamarisk (salt cedar). Reduction of the delta's size has also threatened animals such as jaguars and the vaquita porpoise, which is endemic to the gulf. Human development of the Colorado River has also helped to create new riparian zones by smoothing the river's seasonal flow, notably through the Grand Canyon.

More than 1,600 species of plants grow in the Colorado River watershed, ranging from the creosote bush, saguaro cactus, and Joshua trees of the Sonoran and Mojave Deserts to the forests of the Rocky Mountains and other uplands, composed mainly of ponderosa pine, subalpine fir, Douglas-fir and Engelmann spruce. Before logging in the 19th century, forests were abundant in high elevations as far south as the Mexico–U.S. border, and runoff from these areas nourished abundant grassland communities in river valleys. Some arid regions of the watershed, such as the upper Green River valley in Wyoming, Canyonlands National Park in Utah and the San Pedro River valley in Arizona and Sonora, supported extensive reaches of grassland roamed by large mammals such as buffalo and antelope as late as the 1860s. Near Tucson, Arizona, "where now there is only powder-dry desert, the grass once reached as high as the head of a man on horse back".

Rivers and streams in the Colorado basin were once home to 49 species of native fish, of which 42 were endemic. Engineering projects and river regulation have led to the extinction of four species and severe declines in the populations of 40 species. Bonytail chub, razorback sucker, Colorado pikeminnow, and humpback chub are among those considered the most at risk; all are unique to the Colorado River system and well adapted to the river's natural silty conditions and flow variations. Clear, cold water released by dams has significantly changed characteristics of habitat for these and other Colorado River basin fishes. A further 40 species that occur in the river today, notably the brown trout, were introduced during the 19th and 20th centuries, mainly for sport fishing.

Environmental impacts

This sediment nourished wetlands and riparian areas along the river's lower course, particularly in its  delta, once the largest desert estuary on the continent. Currently, the majority of sediments carried by the Colorado River are deposited at the upper end of Lake Powell, and most of the remainder ends up in Lake Mead. Various estimates place the time it would take for Powell to completely fill with silt at 300 to 700 years. Dams trapping sediment not only pose damage to river habitat but also threaten future operations of the Colorado River reservoir system.

Reduction in flow caused by dams, diversions, water for thermoelectric power stations, and evaporation losses from reservoirs – the latter of which consumes more than 15 percent of the river's natural runoff—has had severe ecological consequences in the Colorado River Delta and the Gulf of California. Historically, the delta with its large freshwater outflow and extensive salt marshes provided an important breeding ground for aquatic species in the Gulf. Today's desiccated delta, at only a fraction of its former size, no longer provides suitable habitat, and populations of fish, shrimp and sea mammals in the gulf have seen a dramatic decline. Since 1963, the only times when the Colorado River has reached the ocean have been during El Niño events in the 1980s and 1990s.

Reduced flows have led to increases in the concentration of certain substances in the lower river that have impacted water quality. Salinity is one of the major issues and also leads to the corrosion of pipelines in agricultural and urban areas. The lower Colorado's salt content was about 50 parts per million (ppm) in its natural state, but by the 1960s, it had increased to well over 2000 ppm. By the early 1970s, there was also serious concern about salinity caused by salts leached from local soils by irrigation drainage water, which were estimated to add  of excess salt to the river per year. The Colorado River Basin Salinity Control Act was passed in 1974, mandating conservation practices including the reduction of saline drainage. In 1997, the USBR estimated that saline irrigation water caused crop damages exceeding $500 million in the U.S. and $100 million in Mexico. Further efforts have been made to combat the salt issue in the lower Colorado, including the construction of a desalination plant at Yuma. In 2013, the Bureau of Reclamation estimated that around $32 million was spent each year to prevent around 1.2 million tons of salt from entering and damaging the Colorado River.

Agricultural runoff containing pesticide residues has also been concentrated in the lower river in greater amounts. This has led to fish kills; six of these events were recorded between 1964 and 1968 alone. The pesticide issue is even greater in streams and water bodies near agricultural lands irrigated by the Imperial Irrigation District with Colorado River water. In the Imperial Valley, Colorado River water used for irrigation overflows into the New and Alamo rivers and into the Salton Sea. Both rivers and the sea are among the most polluted bodies of water in the United States, posing dangers not only to aquatic life but to contact by humans and migrating birds. Pollution from agricultural runoff is not limited to the lower river; the issue is also significant in upstream reaches such as Colorado's Grand Valley, also a major center of irrigated agriculture.

Large dams such as Hoover and Glen Canyon typically release water from lower levels of their reservoirs, resulting in stable and relatively cold year-round temperatures in long reaches of the river. Changes in temperature regime have caused declines of native fish populations, and stable flows have enabled increased vegetation growth, obstructing riverside habitat. These flow patterns have also made the Colorado more dangerous to recreational boaters; people are more likely to die of hypothermia in the colder water, and the general lack of flooding allows rockslides to build up, making the river more difficult to navigate.

Minute 319
In the 21st century, there has been renewed interest in restoring a limited water flow to the delta. In November 2012, the U.S. and Mexico reached an agreement, known as Minute 319, permitting Mexico storage of its water allotment in U.S. reservoirs during wet years, thus increasing the efficiency with which the water can be used. The water will be used to provide both an annual base flow and a spring "pulse flow" to mimic the river's original snowmelt-driven regime. This pulse reached the sea on May 16, 2014, marking the first time in 16 years that any water from the Colorado flowed into the ocean, and was hailed as "an experiment of historic political and ecological significance" and a landmark in U.S.–Mexican cooperation in conservation.

Recreation

Famed for its dramatic rapids and canyons, the Colorado is one of the most desirable whitewater rivers in the United States, and its Grand Canyon section—run by more than 22,000 people annually—has been called the "granddaddy of rafting trips". Grand Canyon trips typically begin at Lee's Ferry and take out at Diamond Creek or Lake Mead; they range from one to eighteen days for commercial trips and from two to twenty-five days for private trips. Private (noncommercial) trips are extremely difficult to arrange because the National Park Service limits river traffic for environmental purposes; people who desire such a trip often have to wait more than 10 years for the opportunity.

Several other sections of the river and its tributaries are popular whitewater runs, and many of these are also served by commercial outfitters. The Colorado's Cataract Canyon and many reaches in the Colorado headwaters are even more heavily used than the Grand Canyon, and about 60,000 boaters run a single  section above Radium, Colorado, each year. The upper Colorado also includes many of the river's most challenging rapids, including those in Gore Canyon, which is considered so dangerous that "boating is not recommended". Another section of the river above Moab, known as the Colorado "Daily" or "Fisher Towers Section", is the most visited whitewater run in Utah, with more than 77,000 visitors in 2011 alone. The rapids of the Green River's Gray and Desolation Canyons and the less difficult "Goosenecks" section of the lower San Juan River are also frequently traversed by boaters.

Eleven U.S. national parks—Arches, Black Canyon of the Gunnison, Bryce Canyon, Canyonlands, Capitol Reef, Grand Canyon, Mesa Verde, Petrified Forest, Rocky Mountain, Saguaro, and Zion—are in the watershed, in addition to many national forests, state parks, and recreation areas. Hiking, backpacking, camping, skiing, and fishing are among the multiple recreation opportunities offered by these areas. Fisheries have declined in many streams in the watershed, especially in the Rocky Mountains, because of polluted runoff from mining and agricultural activities. The Colorado's major reservoirs are also heavily traveled summer destinations. Houseboating and water-skiing are popular activities on Lakes Mead, Powell, Havasu, and Mojave, as well as Flaming Gorge Reservoir in Utah and Wyoming, and Navajo Reservoir in New Mexico and Colorado. Lake Powell and surrounding Glen Canyon National Recreation Area received more than two million visitors per year in 2007, while nearly 7.9 million people visited Lake Mead and the Lake Mead National Recreation Area in 2008. Colorado River recreation employs some 250,000 people and contributes $26 billion each year to the Southwest economy.

See also

 Colorado River Delta
 Colorado Desert
 List of Colorado River rapids and features
 List of dams in the Colorado River system
 List of largest reservoirs in the United States
 List of longest rivers of Mexico
 List of longest rivers of the United States (by main stem)
 London Bridge (Lake Havasu City)
 Moab uranium mill tailings pile
 Upper Colorado River Endangered Fish Recovery Program

Explanatory notes

Citations

Works cited

Further reading

 Darrah, William Culp, Ralph V. Chamberlin, and Charles Kelly, editors. (2009). The Exploration of the Colorado River in 1869 and 1871–1872: Biographical Sketches and Original Documents of the First Powell Expedition of 1869 and the Second Powell Expedition of 1871–1872. .
 
 Fleck, Richard F., editor. (2000). A Colorado River Reader. .
 Fowler, Don D., editor. (2012). Cleaving an Unknown World: The Powell Expeditions and the Scientific Exploration of the Colorado Plateau. .
 Gregory, Herbert E., William Culp Darrah, and Charles Kelly, editors. (2009). The Exploration of the Colorado River and the High Plateaus of Utah by the Second Powell Expedition of 1871–1872. .

External links

 Agriculture in the Colorado River Basin: Colorado River Water Users Association
 Colorado River Water Allocations by State: GOOD Infographics
 Drought in the Upper Colorado River Basin: U.S. Bureau of Reclamation
 Irrigation Water Withdrawals in the Colorado River Basin: Pacific Institute
 Living Rivers: Colorado Riverkeeper
 Water Level Data for Major Colorado River Reservoirs: water-data.com
 Where the Colorado Runs Dry: The New York Times
 1854 report from the U.S. Army Corps of Topographical Engineers: Report of an expedition down the Zuni and Colorado Rivers
 Killing the Colorado – ProPublica
 Lawrence Pratt Collection Concerning Arizona v. California and the Colorado River. Yale Collection of Western Americana, Beinecke Rare Book and Manuscript Library.

 
Border rivers
Borders of Arizona
Borders of California
Borders of Nevada
Colorado Desert
Colorado Plateau
Drainage basins of the Pacific Ocean
Freshwater ecoregions
International rivers of North America
Mojave Desert
Rivers of Arizona
Rivers of Baja California
Rivers of Clark County, Nevada
Rivers of Coconino County, Arizona
Rivers of Colorado
Rivers of Eagle County, Colorado
Rivers of Garfield County, Utah
Rivers of Grand County, Utah
Rivers of Imperial County, California
Rivers of Kane County, Utah
Rivers of La Paz County, Arizona
Rivers of Mesa County, Colorado
Rivers of Mohave County, Arizona
Rivers of Nevada
Rivers of Riverside County, California
Rivers of Rocky Mountain National Park
Rivers of San Bernardino County, California
Rivers of San Juan County, Utah
Rivers of Sonora
Rivers of Southern California
Rivers of the Gulf of California
Rivers of Utah
Rivers of Yuma County, Arizona
Sonoran Desert